Constitution Week is an American observance to commemorate the adoption of the United States Constitution.

History
The observance runs annually from September 17 to September 23. It was officially enacted on August 2, 1956, by President Dwight D. Eisenhower from a congressional resolution petitioned by the Daughters of the American Revolution  , but it was George W Bush who officially declared the inception of Constitution Week in September 2002.

Purpose
The purpose of the observance week is to promote study and education about the United States Constitution which was originally adopted by the American Congress of the Confederation on September 17, 1787.  Specifically, the Daughter's of the American Revolution state the purpose as:
 Emphasize citizens' responsibilities for protecting and defending the Constitution. 
 Inform people that the Constitution is the basis for America's great heritage and the foundation for our way of life. 
 Encourage the study of the historical events which led to the framing of the Constitution in September 1787.

Observances
Many naturalization ceremonies are held during Constitution Week.  In 2019, the USCIS held over 300 ceremonies in which over 30,000 people became U.S. citizens, during Constitution Week, extended by starting on September 13.

President Donald Trump proclaimed Constitution Week on September 17, 2017.

Members of the  Daughters of the American Revolution  observe Constitution Week by ringing bells at 4pm EST on Constitution Day (Sep 17th), obtaining proclamations from public officials, creating displays in schools, libraries, courthouses, and other public areas, distributing copies of the Constitution, Preamble to the Constitution, and other patriotic literature, and other efforts to educate their community about the Constitution.

References

External links
Landon, Bren, "America Celebrates U.S. Constitution", Daughters of the American Revolution dar.org, 10 September 2014.

September observances
Awareness weeks in the United States